ESO 198-13 is a ring galaxy with multiple ring-like structures located about 240 million light-years away in the constellation Eridanus.

Physical characteristics 
This galaxy has three ring structures. There is a small bright inner ring located close to the nucleus. This feature has been interpreted as a nuclear ring due to being similar to the nuclear rings in a barred spiral galaxy (e.g. NGC 1512, NGC 4314). Also this ring has a diameter of 15,527.12 light-years (4.76 kpc) which is larger than the average diameter of a nuclear ring (4,893 light-years/1.5 kpc). Surrounding the nuclear ring, a flocculent inner ring with a diameter of 54,801.6 light-years (16.8 kpc) can be found. It appears to be made of a very tightly wound spiral arm. It also could be a superposition of two rings offset from each other. Outside of the flocculent inner ring, there is a very large and faint outer ring with a diameter of 162,773.8 light-years (49.9 kpc).

See also 
 Hoag's object
 PGC 100174
 List of ring galaxies
 Cartwheel Galaxy

References

External links 

The de Vaucouleurs Atlas of Galaxies entry on ESO 198-13

Ring galaxies
Eridanus
9463
198-13